This is a list of electoral results for the Electoral district of Point Cook in Victorian state elections.

Members for Point Cook

Election results

Elections in the 2020s

References

Victoria (Australia) state electoral results by district
2022 establishments in Australia